KOTM may refer to:

 KOTM-FM, a radio station (97.7 FM) licensed to Ottumwa, Iowa, United States
 Ottumwa Industrial Airport (ICAO code KOTM)
 Knights of the Maccabees, a historic fraternal association in Canada and the United States

See also
 King of the Monsters (disambiguation)